Alacaris is an extinct genus of fuxianhuiid arthropod known from the Cambrian period. It is only known from the type species Alacaris mirabilis (mistakenly named Alacaris multinoda in a figure in the describing paper) from the Cambrian Stage 3 aged Xiaoshiba Lagerstätte in Yunnan Province, China. It is morphologically similar to Chengjiangocaris, with which it forms a clade within Fuxianhuiida. Individuals reach a maximum of 12 centimetres in length, with a trunk consisting of 13 tergites. The basal region of the post-deutocerebral limbs were used in feeding, with the rhythmic movement of the legs guiding food towards the mouth along the food groove between the limbs, with gnathobases present near the mouth to macerate food.

Phylogeny

References 

Cambrian animals of Asia
Cambrian arthropods

Cambrian genus extinctions